Sonic Codex is an album by Norwegian guitarist Eivind Aarset.

Background 
This fourth solo album Sonic Codex from Norwegian guitarist Eivind Aarset incorporates concepts from his earlier albums, restates, elaborates and reinforces them to generate a genuine masterpiece, that might be a defining moment in both Aarset’s career and the history of Jazzland. Sonic Codex puts forward rules of engagement that Aarset collaborate with the audience, and very deliberately quotes and redefines the musicality that made up his previous three albums, “Electronique Noire”, “Light Extracts”, and “Connected”, yet also points his way forward: it is an innovative present that simultaneously summarizes the past, and predicts the future.

Reception 
The review of the Norwegian newspaper Dagbladet awarded the album 4 stars (dice).

Track listing 
«Sign Of Seven» (6:26) Bass clarinet – Hans Ulrik Baritone guitar & celesta – Audun Erlien
«Quicksilver Dream» (6:23) Bass clarinet – Hans Ulrik Drums – Anders Engen Featuring (sample) – Punkt
«Dröbak Saray» (6:47) Synthesizer – Audun Erlien & Wetle Holte
«Cameo» (5:17) Celesta – Wetle Holte
«Still Changing» (8:11) Banjo – Tor Egil Kreken Organ (Wurlitzer), vocal sampler – Audun Erlien Synthesizer & piano – Wetle Holte
«Black Noise/White Silence» (3:06) Electric bass – Marius Reksjø
«Family Pictures III» (3:38) Electric bass – Eivind Aarset Sampler (field Recording), producer – Erik Honoré Sampler & producer – Jan Bang
«Sleeps With Fishes» (6:28)
«The Return Of Black Noise And Murky Lamabada» (11:34) Electric bass – Marius Reksjø

Credits 
Acoustic bass – Marius Reksjø (tracks: 1-2, 8)
Drums, percussion & programming – Wetle Holte
Electric bass – Audun Erlien (tracks: 3-5)
Guitars, kalimba, percussion (logdrum), programming, glockenspiel & additional recordings – Eivind Aarset
Artwork – Stoffen Ganes
Mastering – Thomas Eberger
Mixing – Erik Honoré, Mike Hartung (tracks: 1, 5), Reidar Skår (tracks: 2, 6, 8-9), Ulf Holand (tracks: 3-4)
Photography (cover) – Fin Sersk-Hanssen
Photography (of Eivind Aarset) – Johannes Rodach
Producer – Eivind Aarset, Erik Honoré (tracks: 7), Jan Bang (tracks: 7)
Recording – Erik Honoré (tracks: 7), Espen Gundersen (tracks: 3-5), Mike Hartung (tracks: 1-2, 6, 8-9)
Recording (clarinet & bass clarinet) – Pelle Fridell (tracks: 1-2, 5)

Notes 
Sample on track 2 taken from "Body Language" appearing on the album "Crime Scenes"
Track 1, 2, 6, 8 & 9 recorded at Propeller Studio
Track 3 to 5 recorded at Audiopol
Track 7 recorded at Punkt Studios
Clarinet and bass clarinet recorded at Pelles room
Additional recordings at Katakomben
Track 1 & 5 mixed at Propeller Studio
Track 3 & 4 mixed at Lydlab
Track 2, 6, 8 & 9 mixed at 7 etg
Track 7 mixed at Punkt Studios
Mastered at Cutting Room, Stockholm

References

External links 
Eivind Aarset Official Website

Eivind Aarset albums
2007 albums